Eloy Tarazona (1880–1953) was a Venezuelan military figure known by his nickname "The Indian Tarazona".

1880 births
1953 deaths
Venezuelan military personnel